Restless City is a 2011 independent drama film directed by Andrew Dosunmu. It was written by Eugene M. Gussenhoven and stars Sy Alassane, Sky Nicole Grey, Tony Okungbowa and Babs Olusanmonkun. It premiered on January 23, 2011, at the 2011 Sundance Film Festival.

Plot
Djibril (Sy Assane), a young African immigrant, tries to make a life for himself in the streets of Harlem in New York. A struggling musician who hopes to one day score a record deal, he survives in the meantime by selling CDs on the street and taking on gigs as a courier with the help of his moped. When he meets the beautiful and vulnerable Trini (Sky Grey), he jeopardizes everything to save her from her squalid life.

Cast
 Sy Alassane
 Sky Nicole Grey
 Tony Okungbowa
 Babs Olusanmokun
 Danai Gurira
 Hervé Diese
 Ger Duany
 Mohamed Dione
 Osas Ighodaro
 Lenore Thomas
 Maduka Steady
 Aspen Steib
 Stephen Tyrone Williams

References

External links

2011 films
2011 drama films
American drama films
2010s French-language films
Films shot in New York City
Films directed by Andrew Dosunmu
2010s English-language films
2010s American films